Jamaica has competed at the World Athletics Relays since first edition held in 2014, Jamaicans athletes have won a total of 19 medals, 5 of them gold.

Medals

See also
Jamaica Athletics Administrative Association

References

External links
World Athletics Relays at World Athletics

 
Nations at the World Athletics Relays